Penrhyndeudraeth is a small town and community in the Welsh county of Gwynedd. The community includes Minffordd and Portmeirion.

History

An older settlement of a few cottages at Upper Penrhyn was originally called Cefn Coch ('Red Ridge') and that name is perpetuated by the Penrhyndeudraeth primary school, which is known as Ysgol Cefn Coch; but the town proper is comparatively modern. The ground on which it stands was a malarial swamp encircling a huge stagnant pool. 

The present town owes its existence as a commercial centre to a local landowner, David Williams of Castell Deudraeth near Minffordd, who in the mid-19th century drained the swamp and dried the pool and constructed many streets. Adopting a scheme of town planning evolved by the builder of Tremadog and his Italian craftsmen, Williams gave Penrhyndeudraeth broad streets and wide open spaces. The main square is a road junction with choice of four roads - one leading to the station, one to Porthmadog, one to Maentwrog and the other to Llanfrothen and the Pass of Aberglaslyn. Williams' daughter, Alice, built the first Institute Hall for one of the first British Women's Institutes in the country in Penrhyndeudraeth.

Prior to the many 19th century land reclamation projects (including The Cob at Porthmadog) and the building of the Ffestiniog Railway, both of which spurred economic growth, the few local inhabitants relied on agriculture and small-scale copper mining. Some men worked boats on the River Dwyryd, carrying slate from Maentwrog to the sea for export. Local women at that time gathered cockles in the estuary for sale in local markets. Penrhyndeudraeth is still known locally, especially by the people of Blaenau Ffestiniog and Porthmadog, as Penrhyn Cocos (or "Cockletown" in English).

Halfway between Penrhyndeudraeth and Minffordd, next to the Snowdonia National Park HQ, but standing apart, is Hendre Hall, where, in 1648, Humphrey Humphreys was born. He became Bishop of Bangor from 1689 to 1701 and then of Hereford. He died in 1712. One of the family carvings at the Holy Trinity Church Penrhyndeudraeth is of him. There is also an oak chest which Richard Humphreys gave to Llanfrothen Church while working as its warden in 1690.

The property named "Cae Ednyfed", between Penrhyndeudraeth and Minffordd, was once the property of Ednyfed Fychan, commander-in-chief to Llywelyn ap Iorwerth.

The town has not always been very religious. Early in the history of the Methodists, they established chapels, and fellowship meetings (seiadau) were established. There is a history of revivalists such as Daniel Rowland who held meetings at Tyddyn Isaf and the poet Dafydd Siôn Siâms who publicly cursed the new religion before himself being converted. He chastised the Methodists mercilessly before burning all their critical poetic works in a public bonfire in the village square. The Old Methodists' original communion chalice is to be seen in the National Library in Aberystwyth. The town was originally in two Anglican parishes, Llanfrothen and Llandecwyn. Holy Trinity church was built in 1858 and a new parish of Penrhyndeudraeth was created in 1897.

For 130 years, the explosives works were the economic backbone of the town. Historically, the population depended on employment offered by the slate industry at Blaenau Ffestiniog and the trade in raw materials through the busy harbour at Porthmadog.

Governance
An electoral ward in the same name exists. This ward extends north to Llanfrothen with a total population of 2,587.

Industry

Explosives
The first explosives factory in Penrhyndeudraeth was established in 1865 as the Patent Safety Guncotton Company. It was licensed in 1875 and became part of the New Explosives Company, manufacturing explosives from guncotton, starch and India rubber. By 1908 it was the Steelite Explosives Company Ltd.

In 1915, the vast majority of the then factory was destroyed by an explosion. Along with this accident and another at Nobel’s Explosives in Scotland, Britain faced fighting the First World War with a shortage of much needed munitions.

The then newly appointed Minister for Munitions, David Lloyd George, ordered a Government requisition of the factory, which led to it being rebuilt to produce munitions and was known as HM Factory Penrhyndeudraeth, employing 349 workers.

Following the end of the First World War, production continued at the factory, but in 1921, it was closed and put up for sale. This was merely just the beginning and not the end for the factory however.

Durham born businessman, R.T. Cooke, who had coal mining interests in the north-east of England and was also the majority shareholder of the Essex-based Miner’s Safety Explosives Company was keen to capitalise on growing demand for explosives in the mining industry and wanted to start production of the much safer Nitroglycerine. This however was found to be impossible at his site in Stanford le Hope due to the factory being too close to a Shell petrol refinery. Cooke knew he'd need to locate a new factory if his venture was to succeed.

On his train journey back from Essex to Durham, Cooke came across a newspaper advertisement listing government owned factories that were up for sale following the war. HM Factory Penrhyndeudraeth drew his eye immediately and Cooke decided to visit the site and found it was perfect for the production of Nitroglycerin due to it being located in a series of valleys.

In 1922, the production of explosives restarted in Penrhyndeudraeth and became known as Cooke’s Explosives Limited. Such was the site's success, R.T. Cooke expanded the factory and subsequently decided to move the Miner’s Safety Explosives Company from Essex, to Penrhyndeudraeth.

In 1927, the factory in Penrhyndeudraeth suffered another explosion, destroying the whole southern section of the site, which saw it unable to produce Nitroglycerin.

Facing the potential failure of his business being unable to fulfil orders, R.T. Cooke had no option but to seek the assistance of his then rivals, who were the only other producers of Nitroglycerin, the newly formed industrial giant, Imperial Chemical Industries (ICI).

ICI agreed to fulfil Cooke's Nitroglycerine orders whilst the factory in Penrhyndeudraeth was rebuilt, on the condition that they could buy a majority stake in Cooke's Explosives Company. Cooke agreed and was allowed to stay on at the company as a Managing Director.

The outbreak of the Second World War ensured that Cooke's explosives company was once again at the forefront of the war effort, producing an estimated 17 million hand grenades between 1939 and 1945.

Following the war, the factory returned to producing Nitroglycerine once again, employing over 300 people. 1957 saw the site's third serious accident since its inception, leading to further damage to its production facilities. The four workers killed in the blast were as Elizabeth Catherine Lloyd, Annie Owen, Laura Williams, and Eric Evans.

In 1958, R.T. Cooke retired and ICI bought the remaining shares in Cooke's Explosives Company, now making it a fully owned ICI subsidiary within the ICI Explosives division known as Nobel’s Explosives Company Ltd which also had an extensive production site in Ardeer, Ayrshire. Although now a part of ICI, the factory was still known as “Cooke’s Works”.

The Cooke name lives on in Penrhyndeudraeth, as the name of a small industrial estate on part of the former factory site.

ICI's priority following its full acquisition of Cooke's Explosives was to introduce safer methods of working and heavily investing in modern technology, leading to some automation and remote control of production processes, with the aim of preventing another catastrophic accident that had blighted the factory over the decades.

This unprecedented level of investment in the factory led it to be the world's most advanced nitroglycerin factories. Its success saw ICI relocate its nitroglycerin production from its site in Ardeer, Scotland and base it exclusively at Penrhyndeudraeth.

By the 1970s the factory in Penrhyndeudraeth supplied 90% of the explosives for the British coal industry in the form of nitroglycerine-based explosive products. The prolonged miners' strike of 1984 and the competition from foreign coal imports resulted in wholesale pit closures which, in turn, reduced the demand for mining explosives to the point where production was no longer economic and the site was finally closed in 1995 and cleared in 1997, bringing nearly 130 years of explosives production at the site to an end.

The site is now in the hands of the North Wales Wildlife Trust as a nature reserve notable for the presence in summer of nightjars. The nature reserve is officially known as “Gwaith Powdwr” (Powder Works) a befitting homage to its explosive industrial past, ensuring its continued place firmly in the history books.

Many people died in accidents at the works, and there is a slate plaque at the top of the factory site known locally as “Klondike” to commemorate them and everyone who worked there.

Granite
Another 19th-century industry in the district is Garth Quarry at Minffordd, established in 1870 to make granite setts for road building in towns and cities. Like the explosives industry, the quarry relied heavily on the coming of the Cambrian Railways in 1872. The quarry is still operational, and owned by Breedon Group, producing roadstone and railway ballast.

Transport
The town is at the junction of the A487 with the A4085 which connects with Beddgelert and Caernarfon. The first section of this road is very narrow and rises steeply through Upper Penrhyn. In places it is so narrow that only a single vehicle can pass.

To the south is the new Pont Briwet bridge providing a short-cut to the Harlech road. The bridge is also shared with the Cambrian Coast railway mainline. A new £20m road and rail bridge was opened in 2015, replacing the old wooden structure.
For generations, the Grade II listed Pont Briwet carried the Cambrian Coast Railway, allowing people to cross Afon Dwyryd from Penrhyndeudraeth to Llandecwyn along a narrow road suitable for cars only. The new bridge allows all road vehicles to cross and the original toll is no longer applied.

The town has two stations, Penrhyndeudraeth railway station on the southern side of the village on the Cambrian Coast Railway from Pwllheli to Shrewsbury and to the north, Penrhyn railway station, on the A4085 near the top of the hill, on the Ffestiniog Railway.

Culture and heritage 
According to the 2011 Census, Penrhyndeudraeth is the 19th most Welsh-speaking community in Wales, with approximately 76% of its residents aged three years or older stating that they could speak Welsh. According to the latest Estyn inspection report of the village's primary school, Ysgol Cefn Coch, 79% of pupils come from homes where Welsh is spoken. In an incident in June 2011, with new English landlords of the Royal Oak pub in Penrhyndeudraeth, customers left the pub in anger and were threatened with an airgun after being told to stop ordering their drinks in Welsh. The pub subsequently had a change of management.

The Penrhyndeudraeth Children and Young People's Chaired Eisteddfod is held annually at the Memorial Hall. The village is home to the Snowdonia National Park Authority headquarters.

There are many language traces of Old Welsh to be found in the place names in the Penrhyndeudraeth area, such as “Pont Briwet /Briwet Bridge (Briwet is cognate with the Breton word "Brued" meaning bridge). Remains of old huts can be found near Ty’n y Berllan, which date back to the Bronze Age.

Penrhyndeudraeth's Alun 'Sbardun' Huws wrote a song, Strydoedd Aberstalwm (approximately "streets of long ago"), in tribute to the village. His well-known band Y Tebot Piws also recorded their farewell album at Penrhyndeudraeth Memorial Hall in 2011.

Football
Penrhyndeudraeth F.C. has a senior team and several junior teams. The senior team are currently in their second season in the 2nd Division of the Welsh Alliance League, after finishing third in their first season at this level in 2012-13 and also winning the Take Stock Van Hire Cup (for Division 2 clubs), runners-up in the Mawddach Challenge Cup and also receiving a trophy for the best official matchday programme in the League's 2nd Division. This followed a very successful campaign in the Gwynedd League (2011–12) when they finished as League Champions and also won the "Gwynedd Safeflue" and "Bob Owen Memorial" Shields.

The junior teams (under 14, 12, 11, 9 and 7s) all play in the Llyn and Eifionydd Junior Football League.

Famous residents
 Nathaniel Jones (1832–1905), poet and Calvinistic Methodist minister in the village from 1865.
 Alice Williams (1863 in Castel Deudraeth – 1957) a Welsh bard, painter and voluntary welfare worker.
 Bertrand Russell (1872–1970), philosopher,  lived at Plas Penrhyn in the village from 1956, until his death.
 Fanny Winifred Edwards (1876–1959), school-mistress and Welsh language author.
 Rupert Crawshay-Williams (born 1908), British philosopher and great grandson of Thomas Henry Huxley "Darwin's Bulldog" the British biologist and anthropologist.
 Alun "Sbardun" Huws (1948–2014), founding member of the Welsh rock band Y Tebot Piws, songwriter, programme director at HTV and BBC, grew up in the village.

Gallery

References

External links